Mario Notaro is a Belgian football manager. Currently he is working for Charleroi as an assistant manager in the Belgian Pro League. Notaro was head coach of Charleroi on two occasions, in 2012 in 2013.

References

Living people
1950 births
Belgian football managers
R. Charleroi S.C. managers